California's 46th State Assembly district is one of 80 California State Assembly districts. It is currently represented by Democrat Jesse Gabriel of Encino.

District profile 
The district takes up most of the western San Fernando Valley. The district, while primarily located within Los Angeles city limits, is largely suburban.

Los Angeles County – 4.7%
 Calabasas
 Hidden Hills
 Los Angeles – 11.5%
 Canoga Park
 Encino
 Northridge
 Reseda
 West Hills
 Winnetka
 Woodland Hills
Tarzana

Ventura County – 0.2%
 Bell Canyon

Election results from statewide races

List of Assembly Members
Due to redistricting, the 46th district has been moved around different parts of the state. The current iteration resulted from the 2011 redistricting by the California Citizens Redistricting Commission.

Election results 1992 - present

2020

2018

2018 (special)

2016

2014

2013 (special)

2012

2010

2008

2006

2004

2002

2000

1998

1996

1994

1992

See also 
 California State Assembly
 California State Assembly districts
 Districts in California

References

External links 
 District map from the California Citizens Redistricting Commission

45
Government of Los Angeles County, California
Government of Ventura County, California
Government of Los Angeles
San Fernando Valley
Calabasas, California
Canoga Park, Los Angeles
Encino, Los Angeles
Hidden Hills, California
Northridge, Los Angeles
Reseda, Los Angeles
Tarzana, Los Angeles
West Hills, Los Angeles
Winnetka, Los Angeles
Woodland Hills, Los Angeles
Santa Monica Mountains
Simi Hills